Anne Fernández de Corres Del Rio (born 30 May 1998) is a Spanish rugby union and rugby union player. She played with the Spanish national team. She played at the 2017 Women's Rugby World Cup, 2016 Rugby Europe Women's Championship, and 2018 Rugby Europe Women's Championship.

She has played for Gaztedi and Cisneros.

References

1998 births
Spanish rugby union players
Sportspeople from Vitoria-Gasteiz
Rugby union players from the Basque Country (autonomous community)
Living people